Elwin Orton is a plant biologist known for his contributions in plant breeding techniques. He is known for saving the U.S. Dogwood plant through introduction of new pet-resistant hybrids, for which some were consequently named after him. His plant breeding work and conservation was recently recognized in the New Jersey Inventors Hall of Fame. Orton is currently a Professor Emeritus at Rutgers University, where he teaches plant biology. Orton holds 15 patents in dogwood and holly plant hybrid development.

Education 
Orton holds a B.A. in horticulture from Penn State (1952), an M.A.  in horticulture from Ohio State (1954), and a Ph.D. in plant genetics from the University of Wisconsin (1960).

References 

American botanists
Year of birth missing (living people)
Living people